The village of Ochsenberg is part of the municipality of Königsbronn in the district of Heidenheim in Baden-Württemberg, Germany.

Geography 
Ochsenberg is situated in the eastern part of the Swabian Jura, on the western edge of the Härtsfeld plateau at an altitude of 617 m above sea level (town hall).

History

General 

The first documentary evidence dates back to 1538. Years before the abbot Melchior Ruff, who was active in the Königsbronn Abbey, had already settled woodworkers, charcoal burners and day labourers on a clearing in today's hamlet. The village name originates from the "oxen (Ochsen) pasture for the abbey, up on the mountain (Berg)." 1572 Ochsenberg was annexed to Königsbronn.

In the tax audit protocol of 1733 is written: "All the buildings in this hamlet are the very least in the whole monastery office, none of them is built of bricks and all of which are covered with straw".

Around 1800, the houses were still not made of bricks and were only covered with straw, and the water was only sparsely available from ponds or vats. In 1817 a major fire destroyed ten houses completely. 1849 Ochsenberg became an independent municipality. With the commissioning of the Härtsfeld water pipe on 11 November 1891 Ochsenberg receives a permanent drinking water supply from the wells in Itzelberg.

In 1910 the construction of today's town hall took place, which also serves as a schoolhouse and fire brigade depot. The supply of electrical power is ensured by UJAG (Ueberlandwerk Jagstkreis) from 1917 onwards. The forester Wilhelm Braun from Oberkochen was shot by poachers in the Falchen forest on 1 August 1926, a memorial stone commemorates the event.

Until 1963 the churchgoers had to walk to Königsbronn, as the Kirchenweg (church path) still bears witness to today. On 23 June of the same year, after 2 years of construction, the Johanneskirche (church of St. John) was consecrated by pastor Traugott Scheytt, the church windows were designed by Hans Bäurle. On 1 February 1972 Ochsenberg is incorporated into Königsbronn. With the age-related felling of the 175-year-old linden tree on 9 May 1974, the redesign of the Lindenplatz (linden square) began. In 1976 the village receives the collective connection to the sewage treatment plant in Itzelberg. The Staatliche Maschinenhof (state machinery yard), which was relocated from Königsbronn, was inaugurated on 20 May 1977. The newly built gym and multipurpose hall is ceremonially opened on 31 March 1979. In 1988 they celebrated 450 years of Ochsenberg.

School, Protestant recreational home 
Initially the school lessons were held in private rooms. From 1910 school lessons were held in the newly built town hall and schoolhouse. In 1964 a new building was erected and the old classroom in the town hall was converted into a kindergarten. For 12 years one teacher taught the 1st to 4th primary class in one room at the same time. Since 1976 the children travel by bus to the school in Königsbronn.

In 1981 the school building, which had been unused until then, was rebuilt and extended into a Protestant recreational home with 53 beds.

Due to the low occupancy rate, the complex was rented to the district of Heidenheim from the end of 2015 until autumn 2018 and refugees were accommodated there. Since autumn 2018 the municipality of Königsbronn has rented the building and uses it as a subsequent accommodation.

Youth hostel 
Planned as a motel at the beginning of the 1960s, the building was abandoned as a shell at the end of the 1960s. In the mid-1970s, the building was extended and converted into a youth hostel with 110 beds, which opened in 1977. On 31 October 2005 the hostel closed, in February 2014 it was demolished.

Ammunition depot, solar park 
For a planned ammunition depot of the Bundeswehr (Armed forces of Germany), a forest area east of the village was cleared in 1963. The construction of the 19-hectare site took place in 1964-65:

 Administrative district with guard/service building and technical area
 11 concrete storage halls
 29 larger and 8 smaller ECM (earth-covered magazine) Stradley ammunition storage facilities (bunkers)
 2 small ammunition warehouses 25 m2 and 50 m2

In December 1998 the ammunition depot closed, in 2010 the bunkers were demolished.

From February 2014, a solar park with 40,000 modules was built on the unused site, which will supply up to 3,000 households with electricity. The commissioning takes place in May.

Demographics 
In 1538 there were 6 houses in the hamlet. At the beginning of the Thirty Years' War in 1618, 40 families lived in 24 houses, by 1648 it had been reduced to 10 houses with 8 families. By 1708 the village grew to 25 houses.

From the description of the district authority Heidenheim of 1844: "Hamlet with 51 thatched houses. Of the craftsmen, Ochsenberg has two potters, some weavers, and several bricklayers and carpenters who work journeymen in Königsbronn and Itzelberg. The economic conditions of the inhabitants, a very active, honest, but rather rough and coarse people, have improved noticeably by the lively haulage business, in which the transport of salt, peat, wood, iron, etc. is taken in piecework by local farmers."

World War I claims 11 dead and 6 missing soldiers, World War II 17 dead and 12 missing soldiers.

With the arrival and settlement of displaced persons after World War II, the number of inhabitants had increased noticeably.

1 Incorporation 1 February 1972

2 Population census 25 May 1987

Religion 
Until the end of World War II, Ochsenberg was Protestant. After that the number of Roman Catholic inhabitants increased considerably due to the displaced persons.

Associations

Choral society Liederlust Ochsenberg 
At the end of 1920 the village teacher Wilhelm Heggenberger founded a girls’ choir. The conversion to a mixed choir took place on 14 January 1924 and choir is given the name Liederlust Ochsenberg. In 1931 there were 63 singers.

After World War II, the resumption of singing lessons began in October 1947 and in January 1948 the choir is newly founded. In 1994 the first performance of the children’s choir took place. In the 75th anniversary year 1999 104 members were counted, 49 of them active singers.

Shooting club SSV Ochsenberg 
Already in autumn 1928 11 men met with the idea to found the KK-Schützenverein 'Edelweiß' Ochsenberg. This takes place in 1929 and the practical shooting started in spring in the clay pit in the Falchen. In 1939 the club had 30 active members and 5 young shooters.

After World War II, shooting clubs were initially banned by the Allies. On 15 October 1954, an extraordinary meeting was held at the tavern Zur Linde to reestablish the club, and the name is changed to Sportschützenverein 'Edelweiß' Ochsenberg. At first a shooting room was provided in the Hirsch tavern, later there was also shooting in the private house of Heinz Elser. From 15 March 1957 on the shooting took place in the leased, municipality-owned barrack.

In 1979 the club had 115 members: 94 active shooters, 2 honorary members and 19 passive members. With the 60th anniversary in 1989 the new club flag is inaugurated, in 2004 they celebrated its 75th anniversary.

Clubhouse

From 29 July 1961 on the construction of the new clubhouse was started. After 6,000 hours of voluntary work, it is ceremonially opened on 26 October 1963. In 1972 the extension of the kitchen was built. 1988 a further extension took place (sanitary facilities, heating & evaluation room). In 1999 the clubhouse gets its present appearance by the extension of the new shooting hall.

Nickname 
Steftsstecke is the historical nickname of the residents of Ochsenberg. A Steftsstecke is a strong and long stick (Stecken) equipped with an iron tip (Steft) at the lower end. People used this stick in many ways. It was useful for walking or climbing steep paths not only in winter, it also helped to push a sled. Often it was used to poke into or examine objects lying on the ground.

The advantage of the Steftstecke was proven by this historical narrative: Around 1820, Ochsenberger boys made their way to Ebnat for the church anniversary (religious festival). The bachelors from Ebnat were not happy about this, wanted to keep uninvited competition away from the dance floor and ran towards the Ochsenberg boys. The two groups already met at the boundary of the mark in the forest. After an exchange of words, a scuffle followed, which developed into a bloody quarrel. The Steftstecke they took with them proved to be a great advantage and the boys from Ochsenberg emerged as winners.

Culture and sights

Associations, communities 

 Liederlust Ochsenberg (choral society)
 Sportschützenverein Edelweiß (shooting club)
 Angelfreunde Ochsenberg e. V. (fishing friends), founded 2016
 Verein Waldarbeitsmeisterschaften (association of forest work championships), founded 1995 in Ochsenberg
Voluntary fire brigade
Red Cross community Königsbronn/Ochsenberg
Maypole friends

Regular events

Natural monuments 

Nature reserve Falchen with field of dolines, dry grassland and Falchensee (lake Falchen)
Sandgrube (sand pit), sand deposits formed by the prehistoric river Urbrenz
Judenbusch (Jewish bush). The Judenbusch is an extensive natural monument with several old European beeches. The name comes from the Jews who camped and stayed overnight there. From Nördlingen in Bavaria they crossed the Württemberg state border with their cattle, had to pay customs and moved on to the markets. By far the largest tree was colloquially called the "Judenbusch". The storms of the last decades affected the tree more and more. On the morning of 18 May 2020, the last remaining branch broke off due to its own weight. Its age was nearly 300 years, the remaining stump has a circumference of 6.35 m.
Village pond
Other ponds, dolines and clay pits

Economy and infrastructure

Agriculture 
Despite the fact that the soil is very meager and mostly small farms existed, Ochsenberg was shaped by agriculture from the beginning. The owners were not able to feed themselves and also had a second job. Up to the progress of technology, the children had to do their service as well.

The number of milk suppliers decreased continuously in the course of time. In 1955 there were 29, in 1995 there were 4 and in 2022 only 2.

Transport 
Ochsenberg is connected to the federal road B 19 via the district road K 3011 (Itzelberg) and also the Zahnberger Straße (Königsbronn).

The closest motorway access in 11 km distance is the federal motorway A 7 near Nattheim (junction Heidenheim/116).

The nearest railway station with hourly connections in the direction of Aalen and Heidenheim/Ulm is in Königsbronn (Brenz railway).

There is a basic public bus service through the public transport companies Heidenheimer Tarifverbund (htv) and Süddeutsche Verkehrslinien (SVL).

Personalities 

Hans Bäurle (* 1931), painter, graphic artist and sculptor
Jörg Haug (* 1937), professor for local history and subject teaching
Frank Pudel (* 1977), sports masseur and personality trainer
Jörg Weiler (* 1981), mayor of Königsbronn

External links 

Ochsenberg in LEO-BW
Sportschützenverein Edelweiß, shooting club
Verein Waldarbeitsmeisterschaften, association of forest work championships
Murder of forester Wilhelm Braun, home club of Oberkochen

(all in German language)

Literature sources 

State manuals of Württemberg/Baden-Württemberg (since 1807)
Festschriften Liederlust Ochsenberg (1974/1999): 50-/75-jähriges Jubiläum
Festschriften SSV Ochsenberg (1979/2004): 50-/75-jähriges Jubiläum
Festschrift of the municipality Königsbronn (1987): 700 Jahre Königsbronn
Book by Karl Burr (1995): Chronik von Königsbronn, April 1945 – März 1995
Article of the newspaper Heidenheimer Neue Presse by Karl Burr (27 October 1997): 70 Männer bauten einst die Hauptstrasse
Book by Ernst Laquai (2002): Ortsfamilienbuch Königsbronn/Württemberg in 400 Jahren
Chronicle by Roland Schmid (2011): 75 Jahre Freiwillige Feuerwehr Ochsenberg
Festschrift Protestant parish office Königsbronn (2013): 50 Jahre Johanneskirche Ochsenberg
Article of the newspaper Heidenheimer Neue Presse by Gerhard Stock (24 April 2014): 40.000 Module für das Solarkraftwerk
Ortslexikon (dictionary of places) in LEO-BW

(all in German language)

References 

Heidenheim (district)
Villages in Baden-Württemberg